Christian Gallimard (born 16 September 1944) is a French publisher and entrepreneur based in Geneva.

Biography 
The son of Claude Gallimard, he founded the éditions Calligram in 1992 at Geneva, which publish the  series among others.

He was previously closely associated with the development of Éditions Gallimard.

He was at the origin, in 1971, of the independent distribution logistics tool, Sodis, and of commercial distribution tools such as the CDE and the EDF, and the recruitment of Pierre Marchand who developed the youth and leisure sectors (sailing books and guides) with remarkable success. 

Always on the lookout for technological evolutions, his interest for foresight earned him sometimes difficult relationships with the very literary collaborators of the house, including his father Claude, who asked him to leave the Gallimard group in 1984.

In 1990, he sold, along with his sister Françoise Gallimard, his shares in the group, which led Antoine Gallimard to create the Groupe Madrigall in 1992.

References

External links 
 Christian Gallimard prend sa revanche avec Calligram on Les Échos (4 December 1992)
 Succession Gallimard on INA.fr (3 April 1990)
 Christian Gallimard: un éditeur en quête de ressources humaines on Le Temps (4 May 2001)
 Christian Gallimard on Salon SME
 Calligram on Ricochet-Jeunes

French publishers (people)
Businesspeople from Paris
1943 births
French chief executives
Living people
Christian